The Ommatidae are a family of beetles in the suborder Archostemata. The Ommatidae are considered the extant beetle family that has most ancestral characteristics. There are only seven extant species, confined to Australia and South America. However, the geographical distribution was much wider during the Mesozoic spanning across Eurasia and Australia, suggesting that they were widespread on Pangea. So far, over 26 extinct genera containing over 170 species of these beetles have been described. Three extant genera have been assigned to this family: Omma, Tetraphalerus and Beutelius. The family is considered to be a subfamily of Cupedidae by some authors, but have been found to be more closely related to Micromalthidae in molecular phylogenies. A close relationship with Micromalthidae is supported by several morphological characters, including those of the mandibles and male genitalia. Due to their rarity, their ecology is obscure, it is likely that their larvae feed on deadwood.

Genera
According to Kirejtshuk, 2020 and subsequent literature.

Extinct genera
 †Allophalerus Kirejtshuk 2020 Early Jurassic-Late Cretaceous (Asia)
 †Blapsium Westwood, 1854 Middle Jurassic (Europe)
 †Brochocoleus Hong, 1982 Early Jurassic-Late Cretaceous (Eurasia)
 †Bukhkalius Kirejtshuk and Jarzembowski 2020 Burmese amber, Myanmar, mid-Cretaceous (Albian-Cenomanian)
 †Burmocoleus Kirejtshuk 2020 Burmese amber, Myanmar, mid-Cretaceous (Albian-Cenomanian)
 †Cionocoleus Ren, 1995 Middle Jurassic-Early Cretaceous (Eurasia)
 †Cionocups Kirejtshuk 2020 Burmese amber, Myanmar, mid-Cretaceous (Albian-Cenomanian)
 †Clessidromma Jarzembowski et al. 2017 Burmese amber, Myanmar, mid-Cretaceous (Albian-Cenomanian)
 †Diluticupes Ren 1995 Middle Jurassic-Early Cretaceous (Eurasia)
 †Echinocups Kirejtshuk and Jarzembowski 2020 Burmese amber, Myanmar, mid-Cretaceous (Albian-Cenomanian)
 †Eurydictyon Ponomarenko, 1969 Early Jurassic (Asia)
†Jarzembowskiops Kirejtshuk 2020 Burmese amber, Myanmar, mid-Cretaceous (Albian-Cenomanian)
 †Kirejtomma Li & Cai, 2021 Burmese amber, Myanmar, mid-Cretaceous (Albian-Cenomanian)
 †Liassocupes Zeuner 1962 Early Jurassic (Europe)
†Limnomma Li & Cai in Li et al. 2021, Middle Jurassic (Asia)
 †Lithocupes Ponomarenko, 1966 Late Triassic (Asia)
†Miniomma Li, Yamamoto & Cai, 2020, Burmese amber, Myanmar, mid-Cretaceous (Albian-Cenomanian)
 †Monticupes Ren 1995 Middle Jurassic-Early Cretaceous (Asia)
 †Notocupoides Ponomarenko, 1966 Late Triassic (Asia)
 †Odontomma Ren et al. 2006 Early Cretaceous (Asia)
 †Paraodontomma Yamamoto 2017 Burmese amber, Myanmar, mid-Cretaceous (Albian-Cenomanian)
 †Pareuryomma Tan et al. 2012 Early Cretaceous (Asia)
 †Polyakius Kirejtshuk 2020 Burmese amber, Myanmar, mid-Cretaceous (Albian-Cenomanian)
 †Rhabdocupes Ponomarenko, 1966 Late Triassic (Asia)
 †Rhopalomma Ashman et al. 2015 Late Jurassic (Australia)
 †Stegocoleus Jarzembowski and Wang 2016 Burmese amber, Myanmar, mid-Cretaceous (Albian-Cenomanian)
 †Tetraphalerites Crowson 1962 Eocene (Europe)
 †Zygadenia Handlirsch, 1906 Middle Triassic-Late Cretaceous (Eurasia, ?Australia)

Extant genera
 Omma Newman, 1839 Late Triassic-Late Cretaceous (Eurasia), recent (Australia)
 Tetraphalerus Waterhouse, 1901 Middle Jurassic-Early Cretaceous (Asia) recent (South America)
Beutelius Escalona et al, 2020 Recent, (Australia)

The extinct genus Fuscicupes Hong and Wang 1990 was included in the family by some authors, but was excluded by Kirejtshuk (2020).

Gallery

References

External links

 Ommatidae Tree of Life

 
Beetle families
Jurassic insects
Cretaceous insects
Mesozoic Asia